Harpadon is a genus of bony fishes in the lizardfish family. The most famous member of this genus is the Bombay duck, H. nehereus, which is commercially fished to supply its use in Indian cuisine, especially in the area around Mumbai.

Species
Seven species are placed in this genus:
 Harpadon erythraeus Klausewitz, 1983
 Harpadon microchir Günther, 1878
 Harpadon mortenseni Hardenberg, 1933 
 Harpadon nehereus (F. Hamilton, 1822) (Bombay duck)
 Harpadon nudus Ganga & J. P. Thomas, 2015 
 Harpadon squamosus (Alcock, 1891)
 Harpadon translucens Saville-Kent, 1889 (glassy Bombay duck)

References

Synodontidae